Trimethyluric acid may refer to:

 Liberine aka O(2),1,9-trimethyluric acid
 1,3,7-Trimethyluric acid